Thomas Bone Arbuthnott (29 June 1911 – 20 January 1995) was a New Zealand welterweight boxer. He competed at the 1936 Summer Olympics, but was eliminated in his first bout.

Arbuthnott was born in Glasgow, Scotland, to David Arbuthnott and Mary Robertson, née Bone; he had five siblings. Arbuthnott married in 1939 to Phyllis Reeves; they had a daughter, Kay.

References

1911 births
1995 deaths
Welterweight boxers
Olympic boxers of New Zealand
Boxers at the 1936 Summer Olympics
Boxers from Glasgow
British emigrants to New Zealand
New Zealand male boxers
20th-century New Zealand people